The BMW X7 is a full-sized luxury sport utility vehicle manufactured by BMW. It is BMW's largest and most expensive SUV in its line-up.

The X7 was first announced by BMW in March 2014. It was officially unveiled on October 17, 2018, with pre-orders being taken online. The X7 has been available at dealers since March 2019.



Launch and development 
BMW provided a preview of the upcoming X7 with the showing of the Concept X7 iPerformance at the 2017 International Motor Show in Frankfurt. Production of the X7 started in 2018 at the BMW US Manufacturing Company plant in Greer, South Carolina.

The X7 is built on the same BMW CLAR platform as the G05 X5, however the X7 is taller and wider plus it has been stretched for increased cargo space and third row seating which is standard and more spacious for adults (the X5's third row seating, which is optional, is mainly for children). In contrast to the X5, it is not available with rear-wheel drive, instead using an all-wheel drive (xDrive) drivetrain for all models. In Europe, diesel and petrol engines are available, while the choice is limited to inline-6 and V8 petrol engines in the United States.

The G07 features a self-levelling air suspension system, with a double-wishbone front suspension and multi-link rear suspension.

All petrol and diesel models feature engine particulate filters and meet the Euro 6d-TEMP emissions standard. The xDrive50i model is available outside the European markets, while the European markets will get the M50i models.

In July 2019, a pickup truck concept car was unveiled, though not intended for production.

Facelift 
In April 2022, BMW launched a new revised X7. The design is very similar to the original first generation design, with minimal changes to the side profile and rear. The major changes are a heavily revised front end design premiering new "horizontally split headlight units" and a revised curved widescreen focused dashboard within an otherwise largely unchanged interior. It is widely thought that the aesthetic function of the horizontally split headlights is to increase the proportion of the front design dedicated to the headlights relative to very large kidney grill. The new headlights were also featured on the new 7 Series and i7.

Equipment 
The G07 X7 is available in Design Pure Excellence, Sport and M Sport trims.

Standard equipment includes Vernasca leather, four-zone climate control, iDrive 7.0, Adaptive LED headlights, wireless charging, and electrically adjustable and heated three row seating. The middle row features three seats with a two-seat configuration also available. The X7 also receives driver assistance systems including autonomous cruise control and collision detection with braking intervention. Other options include cooled and heated cup holders, a panoramic sunroof with LED light patterns, and laser headlights. An off-road package adds selectable off-road driving modes and adjusts the ride height, acceleration and transmission response, and traction control system.

The instrument cluster features a camera to ensure the driver is paying attention to the road while autonomous functions are active, and allows the driver to take their hands off the steering wheel for up to one minute. Additionally it has an optional head up display that in many other vehicles it normally fits just the speed, however, because of the size of the BMW headup display, it also shows a clear map with navigation instructions, rendering the information center somewhat pointless to the driver.

30-40 models with the M Sport trim and M50 models can be fitted with M Performance Parts. These include carbon fibre mirrors, a sport steering wheel, floor mats and steel pedals.

Models

Petrol engines

Diesel engines

References

External links 

 

X7
All-wheel-drive vehicles
Luxury crossover sport utility vehicles
Full-size sport utility vehicles
Cars introduced in 2018
2020s cars
Flagship vehicles